Pat the Bunny is the first "touch and feel" interactive children's book, written and illustrated by Dorothy Kunhardt. Since its publication in 1940, it has been a perennial best-seller in the United States. Rather than follow a linear narrative, the book invites the reader to engage in tactile activities, such as patting the fake fur of a rabbit, feeling sandpaper that stands for "Daddy's scratchy face," trying on "Mummy's ring," reading a book within a book, playing peekaboo with a cloth, and gazing into a mirror.

It was written and illustrated by author Dorothy Kunhardt, who wrote Pat the Bunny for her three-year-old daughter Edith, who went on to become a children's writer herself. The New York Times considered it the first interactive books ever written.

Child development experts, such as pediatrician Pierrette Mimi Poinsett, recommend the book due to its "sensory approach."

Reception and legacy
As of 2006, Pat the Bunny had sold over 6 million copies, making it the number-6 all-time bestselling children's hardcover book, according to Publishers Weekly. 

Kunhardt's daughter Edith Kunhardt Davis wrote three companions: Pat the Cat in 1984, Pat the Puppy in 1991, and Pat the Pony in 1997.

The publisher, Random House, has developed an entire line of related products. 

In 2000, DIC Entertainment discussed creating a TV series based on the book. The book continues to be popular, appearing as eleventh best selling children's illustrated book for the week of June 15, 2006. Golden Press makes more than a quarter million copies a year. In August 2004, Classic Media and Evergreen Concepts partnered to help promote the Pat the Bunny brand. On March 4, 2008, a DVD of the book was released with interactive materials included and an interview with Jean Kunhardt, the author's granddaughter. In 2011, Random House Children's Books released a ""pat the bunny"" app, inspired by the original book, for iPad, iPhone, and iPod touch which received critical acclaim.

In a season 23 episode of Sesame Street, Lillias White read the book to a Baby Honker, when Benny Rabbit hops over, thinking that they're mentioning him as a bunny. The Baby Honker pets him, to which Lillias says "she's patting the Benny".

There have been parodies of the book also, such as Pat the Politician, mocking contemporary political figures, and Pat the Yuppie, which includes activities like touching the sheepskin seatcovers of their new BMW and rubbing the exposed brick of their new condominium's wall.

The proceeds from Pat the Bunny support I Am Your Child, a national public awareness campaign created by the Reiner Foundation to stress the importance of early brain development.

References

1940 children's books
American picture books
Books about rabbits and hares
Golden Books books
Western Publishing
DreamWorks Classics